Noitumaa is the sixth studio album by the Finnish dark metal band Ajattara. It was released in 2009 on Spinefarm Records. The album differs from the other Ajattara albums by being fully acoustic.

Track listing

Personnel
 Ruoja - vocals, guitars, Jew's harp
 Tohtori Kuolio - bass
 Kalmos - guitars
 Malakias IV - drums
 Raajat - guitars, organ

External links
 Noitumaa at Allmusic

2009 albums
Ajattara albums